East Lincoln Township is located in Logan County, Illinois. As of the 2010 census, its population was 8,813 and it contained 3,678 housing units.

Geography

Cities, Towns, Villages
Lincoln (east half)

Unincorporated Towns
Lawndale 
Skelton (west half)

Demographics

References

External links
US Census
City-data.com

Townships in Logan County, Illinois
Townships in Illinois